The 1993 UIAA Climbing World Championships, the 2nd edition, were held in Innsbruck, Austria from 29 to 30 April 1993. It was organized by the Union Internationale des Associations d'Alpinisme (UIAA). The championships consisted of lead and speed events.

Medalists

Lead 
François Legrand and Susi Good won and defended their titles.

Speed 
Vladimir Netsvetaev-Dolgalev and Olga Bibik were the 1993 Speed World Cup Champions. Defending champions Hans Florine and Isabelle Dorsimond placed 4th and 2nd respectively.

References 

 IFSC Climbing World Championships
World Climbing Championships
International sports competitions hosted by Austria